Love Is the Perfect Crime is a 2013 French-Swiss drama thriller film directed by Arnaud Larrieu and Jean-Marie Larrieu. It was screened in the Special Presentation section at the 2013 Toronto International Film Festival.

Plot
Marc, who shares a remote mountain chalet with his sister, teaches literature at the polytechnic beside the lake in Lausanne and cannot resist his female students. One of them, Barbara, in the morning is found dead in his bed. When she is reported missing, the police open an enquiry and her glamorous young stepmother Anna starts her own investigation. Anna easily seduces the ever-amorous Marc, while he at the same time is unsuccessfully fending off both a sexy young student Annie and his frustrated spinster sister Marianne, who is being wooed by Richard, his head of department. But the police are closing in and Anna may not be what she appears.

Cast
 Mathieu Amalric as Marc 
 Karin Viard as Marianne 
 Maïwenn as Anna 
 Sara Forestier as Annie 
 Denis Podalydès as Richard 
 Marion Duval as Barbara 
 Damien Dorsaz as The young inspector	
 Carl von Malaisé as The biker
 Pierre Maillard as M. Marinelli

Filming
Part of the film was shot at the Learning Centre of the École polytechnique fédérale de Lausanne.

References

External links
 

2013 films
2013 drama films
2013 thriller drama films
French thriller drama films
Swiss thriller drama films
2010s French-language films
Films directed by Arnaud Larrieu
Films directed by Jean-Marie Larrieu
Films shot in Switzerland
Films set in Switzerland
Gaumont Film Company films
Films based on French novels
French-language Swiss films
2010s French films